Olivia Inspi' Reira (Trapnest), is the third album by Japanese singer-songwriter Olivia Lufkin. It was released on February 28, 2007 and features original songs and singles from the anime, Nana, for which she serves as the song vocal-cast of Reira of Trapnest. It includes two live versions of "A Little Pain" and "Wish" in addition to a previously unpublished song.

In addition to the CD, the DVD contains live performances of a little pain and SpiderSpins at the Nana Special Street Live held at Shinjuku Station Square June 25, 2006 as well as an animation clip of a little pain.

Track listing

CD

DVD 
 Nana Special Street Live at Shinjuku Station Square 25 June 2006:
 01. A Little Pain
 02. SpiderSpins
 A Little Pain: Trapnest original animation clip (Studio Live TV size ver)

2007 albums
Olivia Lufkin albums
2007 live albums
Live video albums
2007 video albums
Avex Group albums